was an early Kamakura period Japanese waka poet. Several of his poems are included in the Shin Kokin Wakashū. He was related by marriage to Jakuren, which made him strongly connected to the network of poets of the time.  He was a pupil to Fujiwara no Shunzei.

Poetry 
Ietaka was involved in a number of poetic matches. One of these poems is from the :

References

Japanese poets
1158 births
1237 deaths
Hyakunin Isshu poets